"Parabola" is a song by the American rock band Tool. The song was released as the second single from their third studio album Lateralus. Initially released in 2002 as a promo only, the single was re-released on December 20, 2005, which includes the song and a DVD containing the music video and an optional "dual" audio commentary on the video by Jello Biafra of Dead Kennedys. The dual commentary consists of two separate recordings of Biafra's voice, one playing in each stereo channel. The DVD was released alongside a DVD single for "Schism" as well. The song uses a modified drop-B tuning for the guitars.

The song is featured on the video game Guitar Hero World Tour. The song was played onboard Space Shuttle mission STS-130, as a wake-up call for astronaut Robert Behnken.

Music video
In support of this promo single, a music video was released – clocking in at over ten minutes because of the inclusion of the 3-minute "Parabol" lead-in (a separate track on the album set right before "Parabola"). The last note in "Parabol" can also be heard at the beginning of "Parabola" in Guitar Hero: World Tour. It was directed by Adam Jones and, like other Tool videos, includes several abstract scenes (which can be seen on the single art). These include humanoids meeting and cutting pomaceous fruit, then vomiting a black liquid in a circle. Another scene features interactions between a small stop-motion creature and a human (played by English musician Tricky). The small creature calls out to the man for help but is crushed by The Berry. The man dissects the creature's body, then wanders into a forest and encounters a leaf that turns into a flaming eye.

The man then sees himself as transparent, with all the internal functions of his body visible. Two flaming eyes appear and begin to fly around his body. As the eyes glide about, lotus flowers symbolizing the "Chakras", begin to line up in the center of his body. The two flaming eyes then join together on his forehead to form a "third eye" and the man is assimilated into an endless, glowing pattern. The whole sequence could be a visual presentation of a mystical experience called "Kundalini awakening", in which a mystical energy or force called Kundalini rises through two intertwined channels within the body.

Painter Alex Grey created the design and was deeply involved in the animation from the beginning of the flaming eye sequence through to the end of the video.

Track listing
Promotional single
 "Parabola" (radio edit) – 6:08
 "Parabol" – 3:04
 "Parabola" (album version) – 6:03

DVD single
 "Parabola" (video) – 10:09
 "Parabola" (commentary) – 10:09
 "Parabola" (Lustmord remix) – 11:35

Personnel
Tool
Danny Carey – drums
Justin Chancellor – bass
Adam Jones – guitar, art direction
Maynard James Keenan – vocals

Production
Produced by David Bottrill
Mixing by Lustmord
Art direction by Adam Jones

Chart performance

References

2002 singles
2001 songs
Animated music videos
Song recordings produced by David Bottrill
Songs written by Maynard James Keenan
Songs written by Danny Carey
Songs written by Justin Chancellor
Songs written by Adam Jones (musician)
Stop-motion animated music videos
Tool (band) songs
Volcano Entertainment singles